Cornwall County Cricket Club was formed in 1894, and first competed in the Minor Counties Championship in 1904. Their first appearance in List A cricket was in 1970, and in total they have played seventeen matches, making four Gillette Cup, five NatWest Trophy and eight Cheltenham & Gloucester Trophy appearances. On three occasions the county progressed to the third round of the competition: in 2001, 2002, and 2003. Minor counties teams were excluded from the competition from the 2006 season; Cornwall's last match was against the Netherlands in the first round of the 2004 competition.

In their seventeen List A matches, 69 players have represented Cornwall. Gary Thomas has appeared the most times for the county, playing in twelve matches, closely followed by Jonathan Kent, who made eleven appearances. Kent recorded the highest score in List A cricket for Cornwall, scoring 80 runs against Somerset Cricket Board in 2002. Steven Pope, who played 109 first-class matches in his native South Africa is Cornwall's leading run-scorer, having scored 294 runs in his eight appearances for the county. Justin Stephens's thirteen wickets for the county is the most by any player, but Charlie Shreck has the best bowling figures, having taken five wickets against Worcestershire in 2002. Gavin Edwards, who appeared for Cornwall on seven occasions, has claimed the most dismissals as wicket-keeper, taking five catches and making two stumpings. Only three non-English players have appeared for Cornwall; Jersey's Ryan Driver, Pakistan's Naeem Akhtar and South Africa's Steven Pope.

The players in this list have all played at least one List A match. Cornwall cricketers who have not represented the county in List A cricket are not included in the list. Players are initially listed in order of appearance; where players made their debut in the same match, they are initially listed by batting order.

Key

List of players

List A captains

See also

 Sport in Cornwall

Notes and references
Notes

References

Cornwall
Cricketers
Wicket-keepers